La casa de los famosos (English: The Celebrity House) is an American Spanish-language version of the reality television franchise Celebrity Big Brother, adaption of Big Brother. The show premiered on Telemundo on August 24, 2021.

This is the fifth adaptation of the international Big Brother format in the U.S., after Gran Hermano which was also broadcast on Telemundo and English-language Big Brother broadcast on CBS.

On August 8, 2022, the series was renewed for a third season which premiered on January 17, 2023.

History 
The series was announced in early 2021 during the network's upfront presentation for the 2021-22 television season. On July 28, 2021, Telemundo confirmed the premiere of the show for August 24, 2021 with Gabriela Spanic announced as the first participant. On the same day, Hoy Día announced Héctor Sandarti and Jimena Gallego as the hosts of the show.

On November 16, 2021, the series was renewed for a second season, which premiered on May 10, 2022.

Companion show 
La casa de los famosos sin censura (English: The Celebrity House Uncensored) is the companion program of the series where events of the game are discussed and former houseguests are interviewed. During the first two seasons, the program aired weekday mornings and was hosted by Jorge Bernal and Verónica Bastos. For the show's third season, Sin censura was moved to a segment of Hoy Día, with Bernal not returning as host.

Format 
Each season revolves around a group of celebrities living in a house together with no communication with the outside world as they compete for $200,000 prize. They are constantly filmed during their time in the house and are not permitted to communicate with those filming them. Every week, the public at home is able to vote on which participant to evict via the show's main website. Viewers can view inside the house at any time with the live feeds.

Series overview

Ratings 
   

| timeslot2         = SunFri 7:00 p.m.
| timeslot_length2  = 2
| link2             = La casa de los famosos (season 2)
| episodes2         = 77
| start2            = 
| end2              = 
| startrating2      = 1.08
| endrating2        = 1.66
| viewers2          = |2}}   

| link3             = La casa de los famosos (season 3)
| episodes3         = 51
| start3            = 
| end3              = 
| startrating3      = 1.39
| endrating3        = 
| viewers3          = |2}}   
}}

References

External links 
 Official website
 

2021 American television series debuts
2020s American reality television series
Telemundo original programming